The City of Holroyd was a local government area in the western suburbs of Sydney, in the state of New South Wales, Australia. First proclaimed in July 1872 as the "Municipal District of Prospect and Sherwood", it became the "Municipality of Prospect and Sherwood" from 1906 and in 1927 it was renamed the "Municipality of Holroyd" after Arthur Holroyd, the first mayor. From 1 January 1991, city status was granted, becoming the Holroyd City Council.

The final Mayor of the Holroyd City Council was Councillor Greg Cummings, a member of the Labor Party. On 12 May 2016, the majority of Holroyd City Council merged into the newly formed Cumberland Council, with a small northern section merged into the newly re-formed City of Parramatta Council.

Council history
First proclaimed in July 1872 as the Municipal District of Prospect and Sherwood. The first council, consisting of six aldermen at-large, was elected on 30 August 1872. The council became the Municipality of Prospect and Sherwood from 1906 and on 11 January 1927 it was renamed the Municipality of Holroyd after Arthur Holroyd, the first mayor. From 1 January 1991, city status was granted, becoming the Holroyd City Council. Originally located at the Council Chambers in Merrylands West from 1915, the administrative centre of Holroyd was located in the suburb of Merrylands from 1962. The Holroyd Administration Centre was officially opened by the Premier of New South Wales, Bob Heffron, on 19 June 1962.

Council amalgamation
A 2015 review of local government boundaries by the NSW Government Independent Pricing and Regulatory Tribunal recommended that Holroyd merge with adjoining councils. The government considered two proposals.

On 12 May 2016, Holroyd City Council, along with parts of the Auburn (South of the M4 Western Motorway) and the Parramatta (Woodville Ward) city councils merged to form Cumberland Council, with a smaller minority in the suburbs of Holroyd, Mays Hill and Parramatta becoming part of the new City of Parramatta Council.

Suburbs in the local government area 
Suburbs in the former City of Holroyd were:

Demographics
At the 2011 Census, there were  people in the Holroyd local government area, of these 49.5% were male and 50.5% were female. Aboriginal and Torres Strait Islander people made up 0.8% of the population. The median age of people in the City of Holroyd was 34 years. Children aged 0 – 14 years made up 20.9% of the population and people aged 65 years and over made up 12.1% of the population. Of people in the area aged 15 years and over, 53.2% were married and 10.3% were either divorced or separated.

Population growth in the City of Holroyd between the 2001 Census and the 2006 Census was 5.28%; and in the subsequent five years to the 2011 Census, population growth was 10.47%. When compared with total population growth of Australia for the same periods, being 5.78% and 8.32% respectively, population growth in Holroyd local government area was 20% higher than the national average. The median weekly income for residents within the City of Holroyd was generally on par with the national average.

At the 2011 Census, the proportion of residents in the Holroyd local government area who stated their ancestry as Lebanese, was in excess of sixteen times the national average; and the proportion of Indian residents was in excess of five times the national average. The proportion of residents who stated a religious affiliation with Islam or Hinduism was in excess of eight times and seven times the national average respectively; and the proportion of residents with no religion more than half the national average. Meanwhile, as at the Census date, the area was linguistically diverse, with Arabic, Tamil, or Hindi languages spoken in a high proportion of households, and ranged from five times to seventeen times the national averages.

Council

Final composition and election method
Holroyd City Council was composed of twelve Councillors elected proportionally as four separate wards, each electing three Councillors. All Councillors were elected for a fixed four-year term of office. The Mayor and Deputy Mayor were elected annually by the Councillors at the first meeting of the Council. The last election was held on 8 September 2012, and the final makeup of the Council for the term 2012–2016 was as follows:

Mayors

Town Clerk/General Manager
The Local Government Act, 1993 removed the requirement that the administrative head of a council be a "Town or Shire Clerk" and specified that the head was to be known as the "General Manager".

References

External links 
Holroyd City Council (Archived)

 

Holroyd
Holroyd
Holroyd
Holroyd